Royal Australian and New Zealand College  may refer to:

 Royal Australian and New Zealand College of Obstetricians and Gynaecologists
 Royal Australian and New Zealand College of Ophthalmologists
 Royal Australian and New Zealand College of Psychiatrists
 Royal Australian and New Zealand College of Radiologists

See also

 
 
 Royal Australian College (disambiguation)
 Royal New Zealand College (disambiguation)
 Royal College (disambiguation)